Rachel Covey (born June 15, 1998) is an American actress, playwright, and composer.

She is known for her roles in the 2005 film Duane Hopwood alongside David Schwimmer and the 2007 Disney movie Enchanted alongside Patrick Dempsey and Amy Adams. For her role in the latter film, she received a nomination for "Young Actress Age Ten or Younger" at the 29th Young Artist Awards. Her first musical, Painting Faye Salvez, joined the New York Musical Festival (NYMF) in July, 2017 Her second musical, Noise, received a workshop production at The Tank in 2022.

Career
In 2005, Covey appeared in the film Duane Hopwood as Katie Hopwood, the daughter of David Schwimmer's character.

In 2007, she appeared in the Disney film Enchanted as Morgan Philip, the young daughter of Patrick Dempsey's character. For Covey's performance in the film, she received a nomination for "Young Actress Age Ten or Younger" at the 29th Young Artist Awards, but lost to Bailee Madison from Bridge to Terabithia.

In 2014, Covey joined the cast of the Radio City Spectacular, Heart and Lights, though the production was delayed and subsequently rewritten.

In 2016, Covey filmed an episode of What Would You Do?, cast as a teenager bullied by her peers.

Painting Faye Salvez, a full-length musical written and scored by Covey, joined the New York Musical Festival (NYMF)'s 2017 Festival. Covey was also listed in Playbill's "11 Women Creatives You Need to Know at NYMF This Year." Noise, Covey's second full-length musical received an off-Broadway run at The Tank in 2022.

Although she had outgrown the role of Morgan by the time Disenchanted, the sequel to Enchanted was filmed, Covey made a cameo in the film as a native of Monrolasia.

Personal life
Covey was born on June 15, 1998. She graduated from The Dalton School in 2016 and Northwestern University in 2020.

Filmography

Film

Television

References

External links
 
 
 RachelCovey.com
 Women of NYMF 2017

1998 births
Living people
American child actresses
American film actresses
21st-century American actresses
Place of birth missing (living people)